Oecornis nidicola is a species of beetle in the family Carabidae, the only species in the genus Oecornis.

References

Lebiinae